The 1906 Wyoming Cowboys football team represented the University of Wyoming as an independent during the 1906 college football season. In its seventh season under head coach William McMurray, the team compiled a 1–1 record and was outscored by a total of 35 to 12.

Schedule

References

Wyoming
Wyoming Cowboys football seasons
Wyoming Cowboys football